Fedy Vava (born 25 November 1982) is a Vanuatuan footballer and former international for the Vanuatu national team. He played in the 2012 OFC Nations Cup.

International goals

References

1979 births
Living people
Vanuatuan footballers
Vanuatu international footballers
Tafea F.C. players
2000 OFC Nations Cup players
2002 OFC Nations Cup players
2004 OFC Nations Cup players
2008 OFC Nations Cup players
2012 OFC Nations Cup players
Association football defenders